Japan competed at the 1980 Summer Paralympics in Arnhem, Netherlands. 30 competitors from Japan won 26 medals including 9 gold, 10 silver and 7 bronze and finished 16th in the medal table.

See also 
 Japan at the Paralympics

References 

Japan at the Paralympics
1980 in Japanese sport
Nations at the 1980 Summer Paralympics